William Bernard Ganley (27 January 1927 – 26 June 2009), also known by the nickname of "The Maestro", was an English professional rugby league footballer who played in the 1950s and 1960s. He was justifiably regarded as one of the greatest goalkickers in the game's history.

Background
Bernard Ganley was born in Leigh, Lancashire, England, and he died aged 82 in Knutsford, Cheshire, England.

Playing career

International honours
Bernard Ganley won caps for Great Britain while at Oldham; he played , and scored 1-try and 5-goals in the 25–14 victory over France at Stadium Municipal, Toulouse on Sunday 3 November 1957, played , and scored 10-goals in the 44–15 victory over France at Central Park, Wigan on Saturday 23 November 1957, and played , and scored 4-goals in the 23–9 victory over France at Stade des Alpes, Grenoble on Sunday 2 March 1958.

County Cup Final appearances
About Bernard Ganley's time, there was Oldham's 2-12 defeat by Barrow in the 1954 Lancashire County Cup Final during the 1954–55 season at Station Road, Swinton on Saturday 23 October 1954, the 10-3 victory over St. Helens in the 1956 Lancashire County Cup Final during the 1956–57 season at Station Road, Swinton on Saturday 20 October 1956, he played , and scored a try, and 2-goals in Oldham's 13-8 victory over Wigan in the 1957 Lancashire County Cup Final during the 1957–58 season at Station Road, Swinton on Saturday 19 October 1957, in front of a crowd of 42,497, and played  in the 12-2 victory over St. Helens in the 1958 Lancashire County Cup Final during the 1958–59 season at Station Road, Swinton on Saturday 25 October 1958, in front of a crowd of 38,780.

Career records
Bernard Ganley holds Oldham's "Most Goals In A Game" record with 14-goals scored against Liverpool City in a match during 1959, and holds Oldham's "Most Points In A Career " record with 2,775 (2,761) points.

Honoured at Oldham
Bernard Ganley is an Oldham Hall of Fame inductee.

Genealogical information
Bernard Ganley was the son of the rugby league footballer who played in the 1910s and 1920s for Leigh, Huddersfield and Leeds; W. Herbert "Bert" Ganley.

References

External links
!Great Britain Statistics at englandrl.co.uk (statistics currently missing due to not having appeared for both Great Britain, and England)
Profile at orl-heritagetrust.org.uk
Statistics at orl-heritagetrust.org.uk
How did my son die?

1927 births
2009 deaths
English rugby league players
Great Britain national rugby league team players
Lancashire rugby league team players
Oldham R.L.F.C. players
Rugby league fullbacks
Rugby league players from Leigh, Greater Manchester